Waves is the fourth studio album and the second major record label album by American singer and songwriter Rachel Platten. It was released on October 27, 2017.

Singles
The album's lead single, "Broken Glass", was released on August 18, 2017.

Release and promotion
On October 4, 2017, Platten announced Waves via Twitter. "Perfect for You" was released as the album's first promotional single on October 6, 2017. "Collide" was released as the second promotional single on October 20, 2017.

The album was released on October 27, 2017, worldwide, with a standard track edition with 13 songs, released to retailers and digital download and streaming services. A deluxe edition with three extra songs was released exclusively to Target stores in the United States.

Commercial performance
Waves debuted at number 73 on the Billboard 200 with first week sales of 8,000 units which was a significant drop in comparison to her previous album Wildfire which debuted at number 5 with sales of 45,000.

Track listing

Notes
  signifies a vocal producer

Charts

References

2017 albums
Columbia Records albums
Rachel Platten albums
Albums produced by Jason Evigan